The 6th Yerevan Golden Apricot International Film Festival was a film festival held in Yerevan, Armenia from 12–19 July 2009. The annual festival had over 450 submissions from 67 countries, 150 of which were included into the competition and non-competition programs. Over 250 accredited press representatives (foreign and local) covered the festival. This was the fourth year the festival was widely covered by Euronews. Among honorable guests were filmmakers Rob Nilsson (United States), Kohei Oguri (Japan), Alexander Rodnyansky (Russia), Sergei Solovyov (Russia), actors Eric Bogosian (United States), Arsinee Khanjian (Canada) and producer Alain Terzian. The international juries, headed by Kohei Oguri, Alexander Rodnyansky, Haig Balian (Netherlands) awarded the following prizes: Golden Apricot 2009 for the Best Feature Film to George Ovashvili for his film The Other Bank (Georgia); Golden Apricot 2009 for the Best Documentary Film to Anders Østergaard for his film Burma VJ - Reporting from a Closed Country (Denmark), and Golden Apricot 2009 for the Best Film in the “Armenian Panorama” to With Love and Gratitude by Arka Manukyan (Armenia). The FIPRESCI Award went to Ozcan Alper’s Autumn and the Ecumenical Award to George Ovashvili’s The Other Bank.

About the Golden Apricot Yerevan International Film Festival 
The Golden Apricot Yerevan International Film Festival (GAIFF) is an annual film festival held in Yerevan, Armenia. The festival was founded in 2004 with the co-operation of the “Golden Apricot” Fund for Cinema Development, the Armenian Association of Film Critics and Cinema Journalists. The GAIFF is continually supported by the Ministry of Foreign Affairs of the RA, the Ministry of Culture of the RA and the Benevolent Fund for Cultural Development.The objectives of the festival are "to present new works by the film directors and producers in Armenia and foreign cinematographers of Armenian descent and to promote creativity and originality in the area of cinema and video art".

Awards GAIFF 2009

See also 
 Golden Apricot Yerevan International Film Festival
 Atom Egoyan
 George Ovashvili
 Michał Rosa
 Özcan Alper
 Cinema of Armenia
 2009 in film

References

Yerevan International Film Festival
21st century in Yerevan
2009 in Armenia
2009 film festivals
2009 festivals in Asia
2009 festivals in Europe